This is a list of artists and entertainers with advanced degrees (PhDs and other academic degrees leading to the title of Doctor). Excluded are honorary degrees.

Doctorate

Incomplete or revoked doctorates

References

Advanced degrees
Artists and entertainers